The 2022–23 Premier League Cup is the ninth edition of the competition. The defending champions are West Bromwich Albion, who defeated Wolverhampton Wanderers on penalties in the previous final. This season saw the return of a Under-21 age limit, reduced from Under-23 the previous season, with clubs permitted to use five over-age outfield players and an over-age goalkeeper in order to help with the transition.

Participants

Category 1
Arsenal
Aston Villa
Blackburn Rovers
Brighton & Hove Albion
Burnley
Crystal Palace
Derby County
Everton
Fulham
Middlesbrough
Newcastle United
Nottingham Forest
Southampton
Stoke City
Sunderland
West Bromwich Albion
Wolverhampton Wanderers

Category 2 
Birmingham City
Bristol City
Cardiff City
Charlton Athletic
Colchester United
Hull City
Queens Park Rangers
Reading
Sheffield United
Swansea City
Watford

Category 3 
AFC Bournemouth
Huddersfield Town
Peterborough United

Category 4 
Brentford

Group stage 
The draw for the group stage took place on 15 August 2022. Teams play each other twice, with the group winners and runners–up advance to the round of 16.

Group A

Group B

Group C

Group D

Group E

Group F

Group G

Group H

Knockout stages

Round of 16
The Round of 16 included all 8 group winners and runners up. The draw was made on January 25, 2023.

Quarter-finals
The Quarter finals included the 8 winners from the previous round. The draw for the quarter finals was made on February 27, 2023.

Semi-finals

Final

See also 
 2022–23 Professional U21 Development League
 2022–23 FA Youth Cup

References 

Premier League Cup
Premier League Cup (football)